Noel Bailie  (born 23 February 1971) is a former semi-professional footballer from Northern Ireland who spent his entire career playing for Linfield. He played as a sweeper and wore shirt number 11. With 40 club titles with Linfield, he is the most decorated player from the United Kingdom (not including overseas territories).

Playing career
Bailie joined Linfield in 1986 from Hillsborough Boys' Club and this was the only club he ever played for during his senior career. Bailie began playing in the reserve team (Linfield Swifts) and made his first team debut on 30 March 1989 away to Ballymena United in the County Antrim Shield first round tie at the age of 18. In the 1993–94 season he was named as the Ulster Footballer of the Year. Bailie played under four different Linfield managers - Roy Coyle, Eric Bowyer, Trevor Anderson and David Jeffrey.

He played his 1,000th game for Linfield in a 0–0 draw against Crusaders on the 24 April 2010, getting a guard of honour from both sets of players as well as spectators as he left the pitch after the match. He made his final career appearance in Linfield's 1–0 win over Portadown on 30 April 2011, where he lifted the IFA Premiership trophy. This was his 1,013th appearance for the club in all competitions.

Bailie's number 11 jersey was retired by the club upon his retirement as a player at the end of the 2010–11 season. Bailie was appointed Member of the Order of the British Empire (MBE) in the 2013 Birthday Honours for services to football in Northern Ireland.

Honours

Club 

 Linfield
Irish League (10): 1992–93, 1993–94, 1999–2000, 2000–01, 2003–04, 2005–06, 2006–07, 2007–08, 2009–10, 2010–11
 Irish Cup (7): 1993–94, 1994–95, 2001–02, 2005–06, 2006–07, 2007–08, 2009–10
 Irish League Cup (8): 1991–92, 1993–94, 1997–98, 1998–99, 1999–2000, 2001–02, 2005–06, 2007–08
 Setanta Sports Cup: 2005
 County Antrim Shield (6): 1994–95, 1997–98, 2000–01, 2003–04, 2004–05, 2005–06
 Irish FA Charity Shield (3): 1993, 1994, 2000
 Gold Cup (2): 1989–90, 1996–97
 Floodlit Cup (2): 1993–94, 1997–98
 Ulster Cup: 1992–93

See also 
 List of men's footballers with the most official appearances
 List of one-club men

References

External links
NIFG profile

1971 births
Living people
Association football defenders
NIFL Premiership players
Linfield F.C. players
Association footballers from Northern Ireland
Ulster Footballers of the Year
Northern Ireland Football Writers' Association Players of the Year
Members of the Order of the British Empire
Association footballers from Belfast